The 10th Legislative Yuan is the current session of the Legislative Yuan of Taiwan, which began on 1 February 2020. Members were elected in the 2020 legislative election, in which the Democratic Progressive Party (DPP) retained majority status as did pan-green parties. The next legislative election is scheduled for 2024.

Single-member constituency

Party-list Proportional Representation

Notes

References

 
10
Taiwan
Legislative Yuan